Tris(acetylacetonato) iron(III), often abbreviated Fe(acac)3, is a ferric coordination complex featuring acetylacetonate (acac) ligands, making it one of a family of metal acetylacetonates.  It is a red air-stable solid that dissolves in nonpolar organic solvents.

Preparation
Fe(acac)3 is prepared by treating freshly precipitated Fe(OH)3 with acetylacetone.
Fe(OH)3 + 3 HC5H7O2 → Fe(C5H7O2)3 + 3 H2O

Structure and properties
Fe(acac)3 is an octahedral complex with six equivalent Fe-O bonds with bond distances of about 2.00 Å. The regular geometry is consistent with a high-spin Fe3+ core. As the metal orbitals are all evenly occupied the complex is not subject to Jahn-Teller distortions and thus adopts a D3 molecular symmetry. In contrast, the related metal acetylacetonate Mn(acac)3 adopts a more distorted octahedral structure. The 5 unpaired d-electrons also result in the complex being paramagnetic, with a magnetic moment of 5.90 μB.

Fe(acac)3 possesses helical chirality. The Δ- and Λ-enantiomers slowly inter-convert via Bailar and Ray–Dutt twists. The rate of interconversion is sufficiently slow to allow its enantiomers to be partially resolved.

Reactions
Fe(acac)3 has been examined as a precatalyst and reagent in organic chemistry, although the active iron-containing species is usually unidentified in these processes.  In one instance, Fe(acac)3 was  shown to promote cross-coupling a diene to an olefin. Fe(acac)3 catalyzes the dimerization of isoprene to a mixture of 1,5-dimethyl-1,5-cyclooctadiene and 2,5-dimethyl-1,5-cyclooctadiene.

Fe(acac)3 also catalyzes the ring-opening polymerization of 1,3-benzoxazine. Beyond the area of polymerization, Fe(acac)3 has been found to catalyze the reaction of N-sulfonyl oxaziridines with olefins to form 1,3-oxazolidine products.

References

Iron(III) compounds
Acetylacetonate complexes
Iron complexes